The 1994 United States elections were held on November 8, 1994. The elections occurred in the middle of Democratic President Bill Clinton's first term in office, and elected the members of 104th United States Congress. The elections have been described as the "Republican Revolution" because the Republican Party captured unified control of Congress for the first time since 1952. Republicans picked up eight seats in the Senate and won a net of 54 seats in the House of Representatives. Republicans also picked up a net of ten governorships and took control of many state legislative chambers. 

Republicans were able to nationalize the election by campaigning on a "Contract with America," and the new Republican majorities passed conservative legislation such as the Telecommunications Act of 1996, the Personal Responsibility and Work Opportunity Act, and the Defense of Marriage Act. The election was a major defeat for Clinton's health care plan, but Clinton's subsequent move to the center may have helped him win re-election in 1996. George W. Bush's election as Governor of Texas laid the groundwork for his successful campaign for president in 2000.

The Republicans heavily attacked Clinton for reneging on his "New Democrat" philosophy that he had run on in 1992. Clinton had passed a tax increase and an assault weapons ban in his first two years in office and had allowed homosexuals to be in the military, sparking backlash. Clinton's push for universal healthcare was the straw that broke the camel's back, as the GOP ran heavily against it in the midterms and is argued to be the main reason why the Democrats faced heavy losses in 1994.

As of 2022, this is the last time a party flipped control of both houses of congress during a president's first term.

Federal elections

Senate elections

In the Senate elections, Republicans successfully defended all of their seats and won eight from the Democrats, defeating incumbent Senators Harris Wofford (Pennsylvania) and Jim Sasser (Tennessee), in addition to picking up six open seats in Arizona, Maine, Michigan, Ohio, Oklahoma, and Tennessee. Notably, since Sasser's defeat coincided with a Republican victory in the special election to replace Al Gore, Tennessee's Senate delegation switched from entirely Democratic to entirely Republican in a single election. Minority leader Robert J. Dole became Majority Leader, while on the Democratic side, Tom Daschle became Minority Leader after the retirement of the previous Democratic leader, George J. Mitchell.

Initially, the balance was 52–48 in favor of the Republicans, but after the power change, Democrats Richard Shelby and Ben Nighthorse Campbell switched parties, bringing the balance to 54–46. The Democrats took back a seat in January 1996 in a special election in Oregon when Ron Wyden won an open seat left vacated by Republican Bob Packwood.

House of Representatives elections

Republicans won the national popular vote for the House of Representatives by a margin of 6.8 percentage points and picked up 54 seats. The South underwent a drastic transformation, as Republicans picked up 19 Southern seats, leaving them with more seats than Democrats in the South, last achieved during Reconstruction. 34 incumbents, all Democrats, were defeated. The incumbent Speaker, Democrat Tom Foley, lost re-election in his district, becoming the first Speaker of the House to lose re-election since Galusha Grow in 1863. Other major upsets included the defeat of House Ways and Means Chairman Dan Rostenkowski and House Judiciary Chairman Jack Brooks. The incumbent Republican Minority whip, Newt Gingrich, was re-elected in the Republican landslide and became Speaker as the incumbent Republican Minority Leader, Robert H. Michel, retired. The incumbent Democratic Majority Leader, Dick Gephardt, became Minority Leader.

State elections

Heading into the election, there were 21 seats held by Democrats, 14 held by Republicans, and one by an independent. By the end of the elections, 11 seats would be held by Democrats, 24 by Republicans, and one by an independent.

Contract with America

During the election campaign, the United States Republican Party released a document that it called the Contract with America. Written by Larry Hunter, who was aided by Newt Gingrich, Robert Walker, Richard Armey, Bill Paxon, Tom DeLay, John Boehner and Jim Nussle, and in part using text from former President Ronald Reagan's 1985 State of the Union Address, the Contract detailed the actions the Republicans promised to take if they became the majority party in the United States House of Representatives, last achieved in 1952. Many of the Contract's policy ideas originated at The Heritage Foundation, a conservative think tank. The Contract with America was signed by all but two of the Republican members of the House and all of the Party's non-incumbent Republican Congressional candidates.

Proponents say the Contract was revolutionary in its commitment to offering specific legislation for a vote, describing in detail the precise plan of the Congressional Representatives, last achieved during the 1918 Congressional election had been run broadly on a national level. Furthermore, its provisions represented the view of many conservative Republicans on the issues of shrinking the size of government, promoting lower taxes and greater entrepreneurial activity, and both tort reform and welfare reform.

In 2014, historian John Steele Gordon, writing in The American, an online magazine published by the American Enterprise Institute, said that "(t)he main reason (for the Republican victory in 1994) was surely the Contract with America..." in part because it "nationalized the election, making it one of reform versus business as usual. The people voted for reform." He said that the Contract "turned out to be a brilliant political ploy. The contract tuned in to the American electorate’s deep yearning for reform in Washington, a yearning that had expressed itself in the elections of both (U.S. Presidents) Jimmy Carter and Ronald Reagan."

References

Further reading
Ladd, Everett Carll. "The 1994 congressional elections: The postindustrial realignment continues," Political Science Quarterly (1995) 110#1 pp 1–22 in JSTOR

1994 elections in the United States
1994
United States midterm elections
November 1994 events in the United States